Ricardo Arredondo (May 26, 1949 in Apatzingan, Michoacán, Mexico – September 20, 1991) was a Mexican professional boxer. A former WBC super featherweight champion, he was the brother of two-time World light welterweight champion, Rene Arredondo.

Pro career
Arredondo turned pro in 1968 and in 1971 challenged Hiroshi Kobayashi for the WBA super featherweight title, but lost a decision.

WBC Championship
Later that year he took on Yoshiaki Numata for the WBC Super Featherweight title, and captured the belt with a KO victory. He defended the belt five times before losing it to Kuniaki Shibata via decision in 1974.

See also
List of WBC world champions
List of Mexican boxing world champions
Notable boxing families

External links
 

People from Apatzingán
Boxers from Michoacán
1949 births
1991 deaths
Mexican male boxers
Light-welterweight boxers